Darius Songaila (born February 14, 1978) is a Lithuanian professional basketball coach and former player. He serves as an assistant coach for the San Antonio Spurs of the National Basketball Association (NBA). He has represented the Lithuania national team. He played at the power forward and center positions.

Early years
Songaila started his basketball career with Lietuvos rytas Marijampolė in second-tier Lithuanian league, the LKAL in 1995. In 1997, he moved to the United States where he attended the New Hampton School in New Hampton, New Hampshire. Songaila played the Nike Hoop Summit in 1998. He was also named to the All-European Under-22 Championship Second Team.

College career
Darius Songaila played college basketball at Wake Forest University. He was named Third Team All-ACC in 2000 and Second Team All-ACC in 2002. He was also named Honorable Mention All-American by the Associated Press as a senior.

Professional career

Songaila was selected with the 50th pick of the 2002 NBA draft by the Boston Celtics, who eventually dealt his rights to the Sacramento Kings.

He joined CSKA Moscow for the 2002–03 season and won the Russian Basketball Super League. He signed with the Kings in June 2003, and averaged 6.1 points and 3.7 rebounds in 154 games (28 starts) over two seasons.

Songaila signed a one-year deal with the Chicago Bulls in September 2005. He had his most successful season yet with the Bulls, averaging 9.2 points and 4.0 rebounds in 62 games (7 starts). However, he suffered an ankle injury in March 2006 and missed the final 20 games.

On July 17, 2006, Songaila signed with the Washington Wizards. The deal reportedly was worth $23 million over five years. He missed the first 45 games after a surgery for a herniated disc and averaged 7.6 points and 3.6 rebounds in 37 games (1 start).

Songaila eventually became a big part of the Wizards' bench and an occasional starter. He averaged 6.2 points and 3.4 rebounds in 2007–08. At the end of the 2008–09 season, Songaila became a starter because of the injuries suffered by teammates Brendan Haywood and Andray Blatche. He started a career-high 29 games and averaged 7.4 points and 2.9 rebounds.

On June 23, 2009, he was traded to the Minnesota Timberwolves along with Oleksiy Pecherov, Etan Thomas, and a first-round draft pick for Randy Foye and Mike Miller.

On September 9, 2009, he was traded to the New Orleans Hornets along with Bobby Brown in exchange for Antonio Daniels and a 2014 second round pick.

On September 23, 2010, he was traded to the Philadelphia 76ers along with rookie forward Craig Brackins in exchange for Willie Green and Jason Smith. Songaila had career lows with the 76ers, notably in points (1.6 ppg). With the 2010–11 season coming to an end, he became an unrestricted free agent.

In July 2011, he signed a one-year contract with Galatasaray in Turkey worth $1.5 million.

In March 2012, several weeks after leaving Galatasaray, Songaila signed with Blancos de Rueda Valladolid. Later that year, he signed with BC Donetsk.

On October 8, 2013, he signed with Lietuvos rytas Vilnius for one season. On July 22, 2014, he signed a one-year deal with Žalgiris Kaunas.

At the end of the 2014–15 season, he retired from the professional basketball.

Coaching career
On August 5, 2015 Songaila was appointed as an assistant coach for Žalgiris Kaunas.

In August 2018, he became a quality assurance assistant in the video department for the San Antonio Spurs of the National Basketball Association (NBA). In September 2019, Songaila was promoted to a player development assistant. In November 2020, Songaila was promoted to assistant coach.

Career statistics

NBA

Regular season

|-
| style="text-align:left;"|
| style="text-align:left;"|Sacramento
| 73 || 7 || 13.4 || .487 || .000 || .807 || 3.1 || .7 || .6 || .2 || 4.6
|-
| style="text-align:left;"|
| style="text-align:left;"|Sacramento
| 81 || 21 || 20.6 || .527 || .000 || .847 || 4.2 || 1.4 || .6 || .2 || 7.5
|-
| style="text-align:left;"|
| style="text-align:left;"|Chicago
| 62 || 7 || 21.4 || .481 || .400 || .817 || 4.0 || 1.4 || .6 || .3 || 9.2
|-
| style="text-align:left;"|
| style="text-align:left;"|Washington
| 37 || 1 || 18.9 || .524 || .000 || .852 || 3.6 || 1.0 || .5 || .3 || 7.6
|-
| style="text-align:left;"|
| style="text-align:left;"|Washington
| 80 || 13 || 19.4 || .458 || .000 || .918 || 3.4 || 1.7 || .7 || .2 || 6.2
|-
| style="text-align:left;"|
| style="text-align:left;"|Washington
| 77 || 29 || 19.8 || .532 || .000 || .889 || 2.9 || 1.2 || .8 || .3 || 7.4
|-
| style="text-align:left;"|
| style="text-align:left;"|New Orleans
| 75 || 1 || 18.8 || .494 || .167 || .811 || 3.1 || .9 || .8 || .2 || 7.2
|-
| style="text-align:left;"|
| style="text-align:left;"|Philadelphia
| 10 || 0 || 7.1 || .467 || .000 || .500 || 1.0 || 0.2 || .0 || .0 || 1.6
|- class="sortbottom"
| style="text-align:center;" colspan="2"|Career
| 495 || 79 || 18.6 || .499 || .158 || .844 || 3.4 || 1.2 || .7 || .2 || 6.9

Playoffs

|-
| style="text-align:left;"|2004
| style="text-align:left;"|Sacramento
| 7 || 0 || 12.1 || .625 || .000 || 1.000 || 1.9 || .3 || .0 || .1 || 3.7
|-
| style="text-align:left;"|2005
| style="text-align:left;"|Sacramento
| 5 || 0 || 15.0 || .421 || .000 || .800 || 2.8 || .6 || .4 || .2 || 4.0
|-
| style="text-align:left;"|2007
| style="text-align:left;"|Washington
| 4 || 0 || 22.5 || .488 || .000 || 1.000 || 3.3 || 1.0 || .8 || .0 || 10.8
|-
| style="text-align:left;"|2008
| style="text-align:left;"|Washington
| 5 || 0 || 15.4 || .421 || .000 || .867 || 2.6 || .8 || .2 || .0 || 5.8
|- class="sortbottom"
| style="text-align:center;" colspan="2"|Career
| 21 || 0 || 15.6 || .484 || .000 || .897 || 2.5 || .6 || .3 || .1 || 5.6

EuroLeague

|-
| style="text-align:left;"|2002–03
| style="text-align:left;"|CSKA Moscow
| 18 || 16 || 21.6 || .475 || .286 || .847 || 3.9 || 1.1 || .6 || .2 || 12.8 || 10.8
|-
| style="text-align:left;"|2011–12
| style="text-align:left;"|Galatasaray 
| 10 || 10 || 15.3 || .455 || .000 || .714 || 2.8 || .4 || .4 || .0 || 6.5 || 3.3
|-
| style="text-align:left;"|2013–14
| style="text-align:left;"|Lietuvos rytas
| 10 || 8 || 21.9 || .473 || .000 || .667 || 4.8 || 1.3 || .7 || .1 || 8.2 || 8.0
|-
| style="text-align:left;"|2014–15
| style="text-align:left;"|Žalgiris
| 24 || 2 || 14.5 || .492 || .000 || .778 || 2.5 || .9 || .6 || .1 || 5.8 || 4.5
|- class="sortbottom"
| style="text-align:center;" colspan="2"|Career || 62 || 36 || 17.8 || .477 || .286 || .794 || 3.3 || 1.0 || .6 || .1 || 8.3 || 6.7

See also
 
 List of European basketball players in the United States

References

External links

 
 
 Darius Songaila at euroleague.net

1978 births
Living people
2006 FIBA World Championship players
Basketball players at the 2000 Summer Olympics
Basketball players at the 2004 Summer Olympics
Basketball players at the 2012 Summer Olympics
BC Donetsk players
BC Rytas players
BC Žalgiris players
Boston Celtics draft picks
CB Valladolid players
Centers (basketball)
Chicago Bulls players
FIBA EuroBasket-winning players
Galatasaray S.K. (men's basketball) players
Liga ACB players
Lithuanian expatriate basketball people in Russia
Lithuanian expatriate basketball people in Spain
Lithuanian expatriate basketball people in Turkey
Lithuanian expatriate basketball people in Ukraine
Lithuanian expatriate basketball people in the United States
Medalists at the 2000 Summer Olympics
National Basketball Association players from Lithuania
New Orleans Hornets players
Olympic basketball players of Lithuania
Olympic bronze medalists for Lithuania
Olympic medalists in basketball
PBC CSKA Moscow players
Philadelphia 76ers players
Power forwards (basketball)
Sacramento Kings players
Wake Forest Demon Deacons men's basketball players
Washington Wizards players
New Hampton School alumni